Geometric tomography is a mathematical field that focuses on problems of reconstructing homogeneous (often convex) objects from tomographic data (this might be X-rays, projections, sections, brightness functions, or covariograms). More precisely, according to R.J. Gardner (who introduced the term), "Geometric tomography deals with the retrieval of information about a geometric object from data concerning its projections (shadows) on planes or cross-sections by planes."

Theory
A key theorem in this area states that any convex body in  can be determined by parallel, coplanar
X-rays in a set of four directions whose slopes have a transcendental cross ratio.

Examples 
 Radon transform
 Funk transform (a.k.a. spherical Radon transform)

See also
Tomography
Tomographic reconstruction
Discrete tomography
Generalized conic

References

External links 
Website summarizing geometric tomography – Describes its history, theory, relation to computerized and discrete tomography, and includes interactive demonstrations of reconstruction algorithms.
Geometric tomography applet I
Geometric tomography applet II

Tomography
Projective geometry